White Oak New Town Historic District is a historic mill village and national historic district located at Greensboro, Guilford County, North Carolina.  The district encompasses 164 contributing buildings built in the 1920s.  They include 100 hollow-tile-walled, one- and two-story, stuccoed Bungalow style houses and 64 car sheds.

It was listed on the National Register of Historic Places in 1992.

References

Historic districts on the National Register of Historic Places in North Carolina
Buildings and structures in Greensboro, North Carolina
National Register of Historic Places in Guilford County, North Carolina